A total of eleven countries participated in  men's field hockey at the 1936 Summer Olympics.

Participating countries
Position code
GK = Goalkeeper
B  = Back
HB = Halfback
FW = Forward

Afghanistan
Afghanistan had a squad of 18 players five of them are unknown. They scored seven goals but only one scorer is known.

Head coach:

Belgium
Belgium had a squad of 22 players six of them are unknown.

Head coach:

Denmark
Denmark had a squad of 17 players.

Head coach:

France
France had a squad of 22 players four of them are unknown. They scored seven goals but only six scorers are known.

Head coach:

Germany
Germany had a squad of 22 players.

Head coach:

Hungary
Hungary had a squad of 21 players six of them are unknown.

Head coach:

India
India had a squad of 22 players three of them are unknown.

Head coach:

Japan
Japan had a squad of 15 players four of them are unknown.

Head coach:

Netherlands
The Netherlands had a squad of 18 players six of them are unknown.

Head coach:

Switzerland
Switzerland had a squad of 22 players nine of them are unknown. They scored three goals but only two scorers are known.

Head coach:

United States
The United States had a squad of 15 players.

Head coach: Frank Kavanaugh as coach and Leonard O'Brien as playing manager

References
 Olympic Report
 
 sports-reference

1936 Summer Olympics
 
Squads